Chanakyan is a 1989 Indian Malayalam-language thriller film produced by Navodaya Appachan under Navodaya Studio and directed by T. K. Rajeev Kumar in his directorial debut. Starring Kamal Haasan, Urmila Matondkar, Jayaram, Madhu, and Thilakan. The film was a critical and commercial success.

Plot
Johnson is a technically-skilled person, who plots to assassinate the Chief Minister Madhava Menon by using a radio-operated car, but the plan gets botched due to unforeseen circumstances. Later, Johnson happens to watch Jayaram, a mimicry artist mimicking various celebrity's voices and meets him, where he introduce himself as a government agent and ask him to mimick Madhava Menon's voice by recording a bogus Republic Day message filled with fake promises. Later, Johnson uses the tape and replaces the other tape at All India Radio Station in Thiruvananthapuram, which shocks Madhava Menon where he is faced with severe criticism from the party members. Madhava Menon ask his friend DIG K. Gopalakrishnan Pillai to investigate the case and nab the suspect. While investigating, Pillai suspects foul play while hearing the broadcast. Jayaram confronts Johnson, who reveals his past. 

Johnson was in relationship with Renuka, who is Madhava Menon's daughter. However, their relationship enrages Madhava Menon and uses his influence to issue an arrest warrant against Johnson's family under the charges of prostitution, due to which his family commits suicide, including Renu, which devastates Johnson. After learning his past, Jayaram decide to help Johnson in destroying Madhava Menon's political career. They humiliate Madhava Menon's character by intervening the broadcasting a televised message and states outrageous comments regarding the unemployed youngsters (the visuals have been dubbed by Jayaram). The duo also thrust by swindling amount of money from a distress relief fund of Madhava Menon by using Menon's mimicked voice. Johnson forces Madhava Menon to shoot him, which he does and Johnson dies, but the murder is witnessed by the cops leading to his political career being destroyed.

Cast

 Kamal Haasan as Johnson
 Urmila Matondkar as Renuka
 Jayaram as Jayaram 
 Thilakan as Chief Minister Madhava Menon
 Madhu as DIG K. Gopalakrishna Pillai, IPS
 Sithara as Geethu
 Sabitha Anand as Jessy 
 Sreeja as Johnson's sister
 Santha Devi as Johnson's mother
 P. C. George as DySP P. C. Soman
 M. S. Thripunithura as Thaazhathu Purackal Veettil Achuthan, Geethu's father
 Jagadish as Tea Shop Owner 
 Jagannathan as Madhava Menon's aide
 Poojappura Radhakrishnan as Security guard
 Zainuddin  as Mimicry artist
 Kollam Thulasi as Opposition Leader Anantharaman

Production 
The film was initially written for Mammootty, who was unable to do the film. The role subsequently went to Kamal Haasan, who was shooting for Apoorva Sagodharargal in Kochi.

The film marked the first of several collaborations between Jayaram and Kamal Haasan, with the pair becoming friends on set.

Music
"Kaalvari Kunnil Kannyasuthan" (Bit)
"Music Of Love"
"Theme Music"

References

External links
 

1980s Malayalam-language films
1989 films
Indian films about revenge
Indian thriller films
Films scored by Mohan Sithara
1989 directorial debut films
Films directed by T. K. Rajeev Kumar
1989 thriller films